Rangoli is a type of Indian folk art.

Rangoli may also refer to:

Rangoli (TV series), an Indian music television series
Rungoli (also transliterated as Rangoli), a 1962 Hindi comedy film
Rangoli Restaurant, an Indian cuisine restaurant started by Vikram Vij
"Rangoli", an episode of the television series Teletubbies

See also
Rangoli Metro Art Center
Swastik Rangoli Kalakar Group, a Vadodara-based art group